Jack Winchester may refer to:
 Jack Winchester (ice hockey)
 Jack Winchester (rugby league)
 Jack Winchester (rugby union)